The Pleurothallidinae are a neotropical subtribe of plants of the orchid family (Orchidaceae) including 29 genera in more than 4000 species.

Naturally occurring species of this subtribe are among the more popular orchids of horticulturalists, especially the genera Dracula, Dryadella, Masdevallia and Restrepia.

The following genera are considered monophyletic : Barbosella (including Barbrodia), Dracula, Dresslerella, Dryadella, Lepanthes, Masdevallia, Platystele, Porroglossum, Restrepia, Scaphosepalum, Trisetella, and Zootrophion.

Many genera in the Pleurothallidinae were found polyphyletic, for example species attributed to the genus Pleurothallis are scattered across five clades.

Genera 
Genera recognized in Chase et al.'s 2015 classification of orchids:

Acianthera – Anathallis – Andinia – Barbosella – Brachionidium – Chamelophyton – Dilomilis – Diodonopsis – Draconanthes – Dracula – Dresslerella – Dryadella – Echinosepala – Frondaria – Kraenzlinella – Lepanthes – Lepanthopsis – Masdevallia – Myoxanthus – Neocogniauxia – Octomeria – Pabstiella – Phloeophila – Platystele – Pleurothallis – Pleurothallopsis – Porroglossum – Restrepia – Restrepiella – Sansonia – Scaphosepalum – Specklinia – Stelis – Teagueia – Tomzanonia – Trichosalpinx – Trisetella – Zootrophion

References 

 DNA-based reclassification of the Pleurothallidinae
 Alec M. Pridgeon, Rodolfo Solano and Mark W. Chase - Phylogenetic relationships in Pleurothallidinae (Orchidaceae): combined evidence from nuclear and plastid DNA sequences; American Journal of Botany. 2001;88:2286-2308

 
Orchid subtribes